The 2022 IHF Youth Beach Handball World Championship will be the 2nd edition of the championship scheduled to be held in 14–19 June 2022 in Heraklion, Greece, under the aegis of the International Handball Federation (IHF).

Previously the championship was scheduled to be held in Nazaré, Portugal in July 2021. But on 19 February 2021, the IHF Council decided to move and postpone the event to 2022 due to the COVID-19 pandemic.

Bidding process
Only Greece entered bid for hosting the tournament. The event was awarded by the IHF Council during its meeting held on 4 November 2021.

Men's event

Group A

Group B

Group C

Group D

Main Round

Group I

Group II

Consolation Group

Championship bracket

Placement bracket

Final ranking

Women's event

Group A

Group B

Group C

Group D

Main Round

Group I

Group II

Consolation Group

Championship bracket

Placement bracket

Final ranking

References

External links
 https://www.the-sports.org/beach-handball-2022-men-s-world-u-18-championships-epr122398.html
 https://www.the-sports.org/beach-handball-2022-women-s-world-u-18-championships-epr122397.html

2022
Youth Beach World Championship
Beach Handball
International handball competitions hosted by Greece
Beach Handball
June 2022 sports events in Greece
Sport in Heraklion